Sick Puppy is a 2000 novel by Carl Hiaasen.

Plot summary
Robert Clapley, a former drug smuggler-turned-real estate developer, plans to build high-rise condominiums and golf courses on Toad Island, the home to a large population of oak toads. The project requires the construction of a massive new bridge to the mainland to accommodate Clapley's cement trucks. On the recommendation of Richard "Dick" Artemus, a corrupt governor of Florida to whom Clapley has given major campaign contributions, Clapley hires lobbyist Palmer Stoat to expedite the government funding for the bridge construction. By random happenstance, Stoat becomes subject to the obsessive wrath of ecoterrorist Twilly Spree after he witnesses him litter the highway from his luxury Range Rover. He tracks him back to the Fort Lauderdale residence he shares with his wife, Desirata.

Twilly arranges ironic pranks - hijacking a garbage truck and dumping its load into Desi's convertible, and filling Stoat's Range Rover with dung beetles - but is aggravated when Stoat continues to litter. When he breaks into Stoat's home, he is confronted by his massive Labrador Retriever and by Desi herself. Desi, who is increasingly unhappy with her marriage, tells Twilly that he is "aiming low" if he is trying to correct Stoat's misbehavior. She guides him to Toad Island, where Clapley's construction crew has deliberately buried thousands of oak toads to avoid later protest by environmentalists. Twilly orders Desi to tell Stoat that he will kill the dog if he doesn't stop the bridge project. Stoat dismisses the threat until Twilly sends him a roadkill Labrador's severed ear via FedEx. The actual dog becomes Twilly's companion after he changes his name to "McGuinn."

Stoat convinces Artemus to veto funding for the bridge but has no intention of letting the project fail. He tells Clapley and  Artemus that the funding can be put back into the budget later, through a special session of the Florida legislature. Clapley sends a hit man, Mr. Gash, to kill Twilly, while Artemus, in an effort to avoid the bridge project being tainted by a violent death, locates ex-governor Clinton Tyree, a.k.a. "Skink", who vanished in the mid-1970s after a short term of office and is said to be hiding in the remaining wilderness of Florida. Artemus knows that Skink's mentally disturbed elder brother, Doyle, is still on the state's payroll as the keeper of an abandoned lighthouse, and threatens to put him on the street if Skink doesn't apprehend Twilly. Artemus fails to realize the dire consequences of threatening a man with Skink's volcanic temper, or of putting him and Twilly in contact with each other.

Desi becomes attracted to Twilly, and the two eventually develop a relationship. Stoat is disgusted and washes his hands of her and McGuinn, telling Twilly that the bridge is going up no matter what he does. A violent confrontation with Twilly, Desi, and Skink on Toad Island leaves Mr. Gash mortally wounded. Twilly is left in Skink's care while Desi returns to her parents' home in Atlanta. Despite her pleadings, Twilly is still committed to stopping the Toad Island project. Accompanied by Skink, Twilly trails Stoat, Clapley, and Artemus to a private canned hunting reserve in northern Florida, where Stoat has arranged for Clapley to shoot a black rhinoceros and win over Willie Vasquez-Washington, a crucial member of the Florida House who is opposed to the special session.

Twilly is on the verge of shooting Clapley with a rifle, but McGuinn runs into the preserve and nips playfully at the rhino's tail. The rhino - so ancient that it has hardly moved since it arrived at the ranch - goes berserk and charges at the hunting party. Clapley is gored to death on the rhino's horn, and Stoat is trampled flat. Artemus escapes the chaos but is mortified to learn that Willie snapped plenty of pictures of the fiasco. Clapley's death dooms the Toad Island project. Apart from his many lobbying clients and crony politicians, only a few friends and family members show up at Stoat's funeral. Desi is among the mourners, during which she is approached by McGuinn, holding a note with Twilly's new address on it. Meanwhile, Twilly and Skink are driving along the highway when they see another group of litterbugs. They immediately agree they have to teach them a lesson.

Characters in "Sick Puppy"
Twilly Spree: college dropout, millionaire, protagonist
Palmer Stoat: lobbyist and political fixer
Desirata Stoat: Palmer's trophy wife
Robert Clapley: retired drug smuggler, now real-estate developer
Richard "Dick" Artemus: Governor of Florida
Lisa June Peterson: Governor Artemus's executive assistant
Willie Vasquez-Washington: Vice Chairman of the Florida House Appropriations Committee
Katya and Tish: Clapley's girlfriends, his planned future Barbie Twins
Estella: a call girl who only services registered Republicans
Mr. Gash: Clapley's hired killer
Clinton Tyree: former governor of Florida
Lt. Jim Tile: Tyree's best friend and former bodyguard, an officer of the Florida Highway Patrol
Nils Fishback: the "Mayor" of Toad Island
Roger Roothaus: owner of the construction company developing Toad Island
Karl Krimmler: construction project supervisor on Toad Island
Dr. Steven Brinkman: staff biologist employed by Roger Roothaus
Boodle/McGuinn: Palmer's Labrador Retriever;

Major themes
Although some of the themes of the novel may suggest an autobiographical element the author himself shrugs off at least one aspect of this parallel. The main character Twilly and himself both had attorney forebears who lived in Southern Florida, but the development in this area came as a surprise to him and his attorney father and grandfather.

Allusions to actual history, science, and current events
One of Stoat's most annoying (to his wife) habits is using snippets from classic rock songs in everyday conversation, especially because he always gets the lyrics wrong:
"I read the newspaper today, oh boy." (A Day in the Life by The Beatles)
"Come on, baby, light my candle." (Light My Fire by The Doors)
"I'm having a tough day's night." (A Hard Day's Night by The Beatles)
"You're thick as a stick." (Thick as a Brick by Jethro Tull)
"Blond sugar, like the song says." (Brown Sugar by The Rolling Stones)
"He's a no-place man." (Nowhere Man by The Beatles)
"Wouldn't It Be Great" (Wouldn't It Be Nice by The Beach Boys)
"Happiness is a hot gun." (Happiness Is a Warm Gun by The Beatles)
"You can't always do who you want." (You Can't Always Get What You Want by The Rolling Stones)
Krimmler, Clapley's project manager, justifies his decision to bury the oak toad habitat on the island by referring to the Snail darter controversy.
Twilly renames Stoat's dog after guitarist Roger McGuinn, one of the founding members of The Byrds.  Several years after the book's publication, McGuinn himself met Hiaasen at a book signing and thanked him for the tribute.
Palmer blames Desi's aversion to cigar smoking on then-President Bill Clinton, "and his twisted bimbos," a reference to Monica Lewinsky's allegation that Clinton penetrated her with a Cigar Tube.
Skink humiliates Governor Artemus inside the executive mansion in a way that reminds Artemus of the fate of Ned Beatty's character in the film Deliverance.
A subplot of the novel is based on Stoat's, and later Clapley's, obsession with the use of rhinoceros horns as an aphrodisiac.
In a 2010 interview with Bloomberg News about his later novel Star Island, Hiaasen said of Sick Puppy, "I thought I'd invented the most despicable lobbyist ever, and then Jack Abramoff comes along and makes my guy look like the Dalai Lama."

Literary significance and criticism
Sick Puppy has been reviewed well and one example describes Hiaasen's skills thus.

Other reviews praised the novel's harder edges.

In his review of Hiaasen's later novel Skinny Dip, Michael Grunwald made several references to the characters of Sick Puppy:

Cultural influence

The title of the book inspired the name of Australian rock band Sick Puppies.

See also 
T. Coraghessan Boyle's novel A Friend of the Earth is a slightly more serious treatment of ecoterrorism and ecotage.
Henry Adams's novel Democracy discusses similar politics during the late 19th century.
Lobbying in the United States

Continuity 
This book is the fourth appearance of Hiaasen's recurring character Clinton Tyree, aka Skink, who was first introduced in Double Whammy.
Twilly Spree reappears in Hiaasen's books Skinny Dip and Scat.
One of Palmer's lobbying clients, mentioned in passing, is a United States Congresswoman wishing to reward sugar company executives who have "persuaded their Jamaican and Haitian cane pickers to donate generously - well beyond their means, in fact - to [her] reelection account." This scam - using the names of migrant workers to cover illegal hard money donations - was also used by the sugar cane industry to support the corrupt Congressman Dilbeck in Hiaasen's novel Strip Tease.
Palmer Stoat, in one of his many malapropisms, mis-quotes the Jethro Tull song "Thick as a Brick" by using the word "stick" instead.  Hiaasen used the same malapropism in the title of a January 5, 2018, column for the Miami Herald, written as a mock apology letter from Steve Bannon to then-President Donald Trump, attempting to explain away some of the statements attributed to Bannon in Michael Wolff's book Fire and Fury, including his description of Trump's daughter Ivanka, appointed her father's Advisor, as "dumb as a brick."

Footnotes

References

External links
Author's own site entry on the novel

2000 American novels
Novels by Carl Hiaasen
Eco-terrorism in fiction
Environmental fiction books
Novels set in Florida
Alfred A. Knopf books